Walter Harrison ("Ben") Plucknett (April 13, 1954 in Beatrice, Nebraska – November 17, 2002 in Essex, Missouri) was an American track and field athlete, known primarily for the discus throw. Plucknett qualified for the 1980 U.S. Olympic team but was unable to compete due to the 1980 Summer Olympics boycott. He did however receive one of 461 Congressional Gold Medals created specifically for the athletes. In 1981, he broke the existing world record with a throw of 233'7", and broke the record again with a throw of 72.34 m (237'4") on July 7, 1981.  However, on July 13, 1981, the International Association of Athletics Federations banned Plucknett from further competition after he had tested positive for anabolic steroid use, and the records were removed. Even though he was stripped of his World Record breaking throws the IAAF still recognizes his throw of 71.32m (233' 11.87") thrown on June 4, 1983, in Eugene, Oregon as the current North American record. He died at the age of 48 due to a brain aneurysm on his farm.

In 1983, Plucknett bench-pressed 623 lbs.

References

 Obituary

External links

1954 births
2002 deaths
People from Beatrice, Nebraska
Sportspeople from Nebraska
American male discus throwers
American sportspeople in doping cases
Doping cases in athletics
University of Missouri alumni
Congressional Gold Medal recipients